Eurosis is the third album by the Spanish ska punk band Ska-P, released on 28 April 1998.

The album cover depicts a pack of playing cards with a euro coin in the centre, embellished with missiles, machine guns and syringes. The ever-present Gato López, joint in mouth, is flanked by tanks and the two lion statues from the front steps of Spain's parliament. The title is a play on words with neurosis and the euro which was about to be introduced as an accounting currency in Europe the following year, and as legal tender in 2002.

Track list

Personnel 
 Pulpul – vocals, guitar
 Pako – drums
 Julio – bass
 Joxemi – guitar
 Kogote – keyboard
 Pipi – backing vocals

External links 
Ska-P's official website

1998 albums
Ska-P albums